Cimbocera is a genus of broad-nosed weevils in the beetle family Curculionidae. There are about five described species in Cimbocera.

Species
These five species belong to the genus Cimbocera:
 Cimbocera buchanani Ting, 1940 i c g
 Cimbocera conspersa Fall, 1907 i c g
 Cimbocera pauper Horn, 1876 i c g b
 Cimbocera petersoni Tanner, 1941 i c g
 Cimbocera pilosa (Sharp, 1891) c g
Data sources: i = ITIS, c = Catalogue of Life, g = GBIF, b = Bugguide.net

References

Further reading

 
 
 
 

Entiminae
Articles created by Qbugbot